This is a list of the National Register of Historic Places listings in Susquehanna County, Pennsylvania.

This is intended to be a complete list of the properties on the National Register of Historic Places in Susquehanna County, Pennsylvania, United States. The locations of National Register properties for which the latitude and longitude coordinates are included below, may be seen in a map.

There are 8 properties listed on the National Register in the county.

Current listings

|}

See also

 List of Pennsylvania state historical markers in Susquehanna County

References

 
Susquehanna County